CKT may refer to:

 Caledonian Airways (1988), former UK airline, ICAO code
 Che Kung Temple station, Hong Kong, MTR station code
 Chukchi language of Siberia, ISO 639-3 code
 Crookston railway station, Glasgow, Scotland, National Rail station code
 CKT (time zone) or UTC−10:00, Cook Islands
 Char kway teow a stir-fried rice noodle dish, a popular noodle dish in Malaysia, Singapore, Brunei and Indonesia
 , a sports club in Ambato, Ecuador, best known for basketball